Descomyces is a genus of fungus in the family Cortinariaceae. The genus contains five species formerly restricted to Australasia, but now more widespread due to having been spread with Eucalyptus. Descomyces was described in 1993 by mycologists Neale Bougher and Michael A. Castellano.

See also
List of Agaricales genera

References

External links
 

Agaricales genera
Cortinariaceae